Sulfur chloride may refer to:

Disulfur dichloride, S2Cl2
Sulfur dichloride, SCl2
Sulfur tetrachloride, SCl4